Narendra Gupta may refer to:

 Narendra K. Gupta (aka Naren Gupta) (1948–2021), an Indian-American entrepreneur and founder of Integrated Systems Inc.
 Narendra Gupta (actor) (born 1962), an Indian actor known for his participation in the CID TV series